John Krasinski is an American actor, director, producer, and screenwriter. He is best known for his role as Jim Halpert on the sitcom The Office (2005–2013), on which he also served as a producer and occasional director. He later directed and starred in the drama film Brief Interviews with Hideous Men (2009) and the comedy-drama film The Hollars (2016). He co-wrote, directed, and starred in the critically and commercially successful horror-thriller film A Quiet Place (2018), for which he was nominated for the Critics' Choice Movie Award and Writers Guild of America Award for Best Original Screenplay. He also directed, co-produced, and wrote the sequel, A Quiet Place Part II (2020). Both films star his wife, the English actress Emily Blunt.

Krasinski portrays the title character in the Amazon spy thriller series Jack Ryan (2018–present). For his performance in this role, he was nominated for a Screen Actors Guild Award for Outstanding Performance by a Male Actor in a Drama Series. He is also a co-producer of the series. 

Krasinski has also appeared in films, including License to Wed (2007), Leatherheads (2008), Away We Go (2009), It's Complicated (2009), Something Borrowed (2011), Big Miracle (2012), Promised Land (2012), Aloha (2015), and the military action thriller 13 Hours: The Secret Soldiers of Benghazi (2016). He has performed voice-over work for documentaries and animated films, such as Shrek the Third (2007), Monsters vs. Aliens (2009), DC League of Super-Pets (2022), Monsters University (2013), and the English dub of The Wind Rises (2013).

He also appeared in the Marvel Cinematic Universe film Doctor Strange in the Multiverse of Madness as Reed Richards, a member of the Illuminati.

He has received four Primetime Emmy Award nominations and has won two Screen Actors Guild Awards. In 2018, he was named by Time magazine as one of the 100 most influential people in the world.

Acting credits

Film

Television

Filmmaking credits

Film

Television

Web series

See also

References

External links
 

Male actor filmographies
American filmographies